The BMW M20 is a SOHC straight-six petrol engine which was produced from 1977 to 1993. It was introduced eight years after the larger BMW M30 straight-six engine, which remained in production alongside the M20.

The first cars to use the M20 were the E12 5 Series and the E21 3 Series.

The M20 began to be phased out following the introduction of the M50 engine in 1990. The final M20 engines were fitted to the E30 3 Series wagon (estate) and convertible model built in April 1993.

The M20 was the basis for the BMW M21 diesel engine. It is also loosely related to the BMW M70 V12 petrol engine.

History 
By the 1970s, BMW felt the need for a six-cylinder engine smaller than the BMW M30, to use in the 3 Series and 5 Series. BMW presented the M20 engine at the 1977 IAA as a 90 kW 2.0-litre Solex 4A1 carburetted version, and as a 105 kW 2.3-litre K-Jetronic multi-point injected version. The M20 was used in the E12 5 Series, E21 3 Series, E28 5 Series, E30 3 Series and E34 5 Series.

Early versions of the M20 were sometimes referred to as the "M60", although the M60 designation has since been re-used for a V8 engine produced from 1992 to 1996.

Design 
As per the M30, the M20 has an iron block, aluminium head and a SOHC valvetrain with 2 valves per cylinder. It has a traditional rocker arm design and no hydraulic tappets. The major differences to the M30 are:
 A timing belt rather than a timing chain
 Slant angle of 20 degrees, compared with 30 degrees for the M30.

Models

M20B20 

The first models to use the M20 were the E12 520/6 and the E21 320/6, which used a  version known as the M20B20VE or M60/2. A Solex 4A1 four-barrel carburetor was used in the M20B20VE ("VE" is for vergaser- "carburettor" in German), and it has a compression ratio of 9.2:1 and a redline of 6,400 rpm.

The M20 first became fuel-injected in 1981, with Bosch K-Jetronic used in a  version called the M20B20KE. The compression ratio was raised to 9.9:1.

In September 1982 (coinciding with the release of the E30 3 Series), the fuel injection was updated to LE-Jetronic with a redline of 6,200 rpm. Other upgrades included a larger port (known as "731") cylinder head, a lighter block and new manifolds. The "M60" designation was dropped and this version was known as the M20B20LE.

In 1987, the M20B20 was again revised with the addition of Bosch Motronic engine management, a catalytic converter and a compression ratio of 8.8:1.

The M20B20 was not sold in North America.

Applications:
 1977–1981 E12 5 Series 520/6 (carburettor)
 1977–1982 E21 3 Series 320/6 (carburettor)
 1981–1982 E28 5 Series 520i (K-Jetronic)
 1982–1984 E28 5 Series 520i (L-Jetronic)
 1982–1984 E30 3 Series 320i (L-Jetronic)
 1984–1987 E28 5 Series 520i (LE-Jetronic)
 1984–1987 E30 3 Series 320i (LE-Jetronic)
 1986–1987 E28 5 Series 520i (Motronic)
 1987–1992 E30 3 Series 320i (Motronic)
 1988–1990 E34 5 Series 520i (Motronic)
 1989–1992 Bertone Freeclimber (Freeclimber I)

M20B23 
In March 1978 (six months after the M20 was launched), a fuel-injected and larger displacement version known as the M20B23KE (or M60/5) was introduced. This version uses the same head (known as "200") and block as the 2.0 litre version but a longer  stroke crank.

The 1982 version used LE-Jetronic, the 731 cylinder head, a compression ratio of 9.8:1 and the other upgrades as the per the 2.0 litre version.

The  version continued to be available in certain markets with strict emissions regulations (such as Switzerland) until replaced by the 325i.

The M20B23 versions were  not sold in North America.

Applications:
 1977–1982 E21 3 Series 323i (K-Jetronic)
 1982–1984 E30 3 Series 323i (L-Jetronic)
 1984–1987 E30 3 Series 323i (LE-Jetronic)

M20B25 
In 1985, the M20B25 replaced the M20B23.

In 1987, a catalyzed model with Motronic 1.3 engine management was introduced. The uncatalyzed engine was kept in production for Southern Europe and other markets where unleaded petrol was not regularly available.

Applications:
 1985–1993 E30 3 Series 325i
 1989–1990 E34 5 Series 525i
 1988–1991 Z1

M20B27 
The M20B27 was designed for efficiency (thus the e for the Greek letter eta in 325e) and low-rev torque. This is an unusual design strategy for a BMW straight-six engine, which are usually designed for power at high RPM. Since many markets tax cars based on engine displacement, the eta's larger displacement meant that it was not suitable for all markets. It was expressly developed with the American market in mind. To reduce friction and improve efficiency, the M20B27 changes include using the '200' version of the head (which has smaller ports), a different camshaft, four camshaft journals and softer valve springs. Due to these changes the rev limit on the M20B27 was reduced to 4,800 rpm.

In the United States, BMW's corporate average fuel economy was at risk of not meeting requirements by 1984, primarily due to higher sales of their bigger, more expensive cars in the early 1980s. The first car to use the M20B27 was the US market 528e in 1982. The compression ratio of the U.S. M20B27ME version was 9.0:1, compared with for cars sold elsewhere 11.0:1.

In 1985, the M20B27ME.E version was introduced, increasing power output to  despite a lower compression ratio of 10.3:1.

In late 1987, the fuel injection was upgraded to Motronic 1.3 on the US market plastic bumper 325e and 528e 'Super Eta', the cylinder head changed to the "885" version, the compression ratio was reduced to 8.5:1 and the redline increased to 5,200 rpm.

In the early 1990s BMW South Africa used components from the Alpina C3 2.7 to produce an E30 specifically for Stannic Group N production car racing. The first iteration of this engine used in the E30 325iS produced  and the second revision, often referred to as "Evo2" or on the VIN plate as "HP2" produced .

Applications:
 1982–1987 E30 3 Series 325e, 325e
 1982–1988 E28 5 Series 525e (called 528e in North America)
 1989–1992 E30 3 Series 325iS (only available in South Africa)
 1989–1992 Bertone Freeclimber (Freeclimber I)

See also 

 BMW
 List of BMW engines

References 

M20
Straight-six engines
Gasoline engines by model